Sitting Pretty is a 1933 American Pre-Code musical comedy film that tells the story of two aspiring but untalented songwriters played by Jack Oakie and Jack Haley. They are joined by Ginger Rogers and Thelma Todd on their trip from New York City to Hollywood to find their fortune. This film was directed by Harry Joe Brown and featured the Pickens Sisters as themselves.

Plot

Cast
Jack Oakie as Chick Parker
Jack Haley as Pete Pendleton
Ginger Rogers as Dorothy
Gregory Ratoff as Tannenbaum
Thelma Todd as Gloria Duval
Lew Cody as Jules Clark
Jerry Tucker as Buzz
The Pickens Sisters
The Hundred Hollywood Honeys
Hale Hamilton as Vinton
Walter Walker as George Wilson
Kenneth Thomson as Norman Lubin
William Davidson as Director
Lee Morgan as Assistant director
Harry Revel as Pianist
Mack Gordon as Song publisher
Arthur Jarrett
Virginia Sale

References

External links
 
 
 

1933 films
1933 musical comedy films
American musical comedy films
Films directed by Harry Joe Brown
Paramount Pictures films
American black-and-white films
1930s English-language films
1930s American films